Miranda Rosin (born ) is a Canadian politician in Alberta representing the electoral district of Banff-Kananaskis for the United Conservative Party.

Political career 
Rosin was named the UCP's candidate for Banff-Kananaskis on November 1, 2018. She defeated two other challengers for the spot. During her nomination race, she was endorsed by UCP MLAs Leela Aheer, Drew Barnes and Angela Pitt; Conservative MP for Banff-Airdrie Blake Richards; and Canmore town councillor Rob Seeley.

In October 2018, Rosin said at a UCP nomination debate that Alberta needs "to look at a two-tiered system, so that we can get those who have worked hard for their money out of the system if they would like to.” The audio of the exchange was released by Cam Westhead, who at the time was the NDP MLA for Banff-Cochrane, in March 2019. Rosin did not say if she stood by her comments but insisted the UCP would maintain healthcare spending in Alberta.

Rosin defeated Westhead in the 2019 Alberta general election. At the age of 23, Rosin became the youngest MLA elected to the 30th Alberta Legislature.

Rosin endorsed the leadership campaign of Travis Toews, UCP MLA for Grande Prairie-Waititi and former finance minister, during the 2022 United Conservative Party leadership race.

In November 2022, Rosin was named parliamentary secretary of tourism. She said priorities will include funding for Travel Alberta, economic recovery for the sector after COVID-19 restrictions, and new growth opportunities for recreation and hospitality. Rosin told CKXY-FM's Cochrane Now that the position "is the exact portfolio that I've been hoping to hold at some point in my career."

Fair Deal Panel 
Rosin was named to the Fair Deal Panel on November 13, 2019. The panel was created by Premier Jason Kenney and tasked with exploring ways to give Alberta more leverage when negotiating with the federal government.

The nine-member panel included Tany Yao, the UCP MLA for Fort McMurray-Wood Buffalo; Drew Barnes, who was a UCP MLA for Cypress-Medicine Hat at the time; former Reform Party leader Preston Manning; and former Progressive Conservative MLA and Associate Minister of Electricity and Renewable Energy Donna Kennedy-Glans.

After hosting town hall forums across Alberta, the panel's suggestions pushed for more authority to create its own services and programs supported by the federal government. These included withdrawing from the Canada Pension Plan to create an Alberta Pension Plan and replacing the Royal Canadian Mounted Police with a provincial police service. One suggestion, a referendum on equalization payments in Canada, was held during 2021 Alberta municipal elections.

Rosin said she was proud of the panel's work and approved of its recommendations. She told CKXY-FM that fulfilling the recommendations would represent "a turning point in our history." Rosin said the report was based on feedback from Albertans who said they felt the federal government ignores Alberta's economic needs, despite Alberta's economic contributions to Canada. Ignoring the recommendations would contribute to economic and political support for Alberta separatism, she said.

Opposition Leader Rachel Notley criticized the panel's suggestions as unrealistic and outside the scope of the provincial government. Barnes was also critical of the panel's final recommendations. He said they would not solve feelings of Western alienation in Alberta, and said Albertans should pursue separating from Canada if the recommendations were ignored.

Opposition to the Springbank Dam 
Rosin opposed the Springbank Dam, a $423-million project designed to displace high waters from the Elbow River into an off-stream reservoir in Springbank, located west of Calgary. The project was also opposed by Springbank landowners when it was proposed in 2013. The Stoney Nakoda First Nation wanted the reservoir moved further upstream.

While the UCP supported the project, Rosin said in a May 2019 letter to Transportation Minister Ric McIver that the Alberta government's consultations with the residents of Springbank, Redwood Meadows and the Tsuu T’ina First Nation were insufficient. Rosin and other residents opposed to the dam had concerns about air and water quality, silt and debris from the dry dam, and impacts on the community and landowners. Rosin told the Rocky Mountain Outlook that she hoped to convince the UCP caucus that a McLean Creek Dam would be a better flood mitigation project for the region.

Despite Rosin's objections, the Springbank Dam project was approved in June 2021. Rosin said she wished a different site would have been chosen, but she hoped the construction of berms in Bragg Creek would provide constituents with adequate protection from flooding.

Alberta's response to the COVID-19 pandemic 
Tourism is the top industry in Rosin's electoral district, and the industry suffered financially throughout the pandemic. In April 2020, she told The Globe and Mail that unemployment in Banff had peaked at 85% after restrictions on public spaces and travelling were introduced. Rosin said constituents and businesses should follow public health restrictions introduced by the Alberta government, but was also critical of her government's response to the COVID-19 pandemic.

Rosin was accused of downplaying the seriousness of the pandemic in November 2020 when constituents received a political mailer from Rosin claiming the "worst of the COVID-19 pandemic" was over. This was in contradiction to statements made by Premier Jason Kenney, Health Minister Tyler Shandro and Alberta's Chief Medical Officer of Health Dr. Deena Hinshaw. Rosin later wrote on her Facebook page that the newsletter was sent in the early fall of 2020 when active COVID-19 cases in Alberta were fewer than 2,000. Mayor John Borrowman of Canmore told CTV News that in a conversation with Rosin, the MLA told him the flyer's distribution was "intentional."

In a guest column published in the High Country News on January 6, 2021, Rosin said "nearly every democratic society in the Western world" responded to the pandemic by choosing to "gamble away their longstanding values of freedom and self-determination in surrender to fear and uncertainty."

On April 7, 2021, Rosin was one of 18 UCP MLAs who signed a letter opposing new public health restrictions one day after they were announced by Kenney. The restrictions included closing indoor dining, libraries, and most gym and fitness activities. Rosin told CBC News that the Alberta government should instead lobby the federal government for a speedier supply of vaccines. Rosin's support was opposed by Borrowman and Banff mayor Karen Sorensen.

That same month, Banff became a COVID-19 hotspot along with Fort McMurray. Political leaders in both communities blamed the spread of the virus on their transient workforces and a large, young population that at the time was not eligible for COVID-19 vaccines. Rosin joined political and business leaders in both communities in calling for additional health care support and access to COVID-19 vaccinations, which at the time was limited to immunocompromised individuals and adults who were at least 40 years old. More vaccines were diverted to both communities by the end of April.

On her personal website, Rosin wrote in September 17, 2021 that Alberta's Restriction Exemption Program was a "middle ground" when it was announced in September 2021 and that it "offers choice to Albertans and gives businesses the ability to continue fully operating." When the vaccine passport program ended on February 9, 2022, she said she never supported the program and was happy to see it end.

Controversies
In October 2020, Rosin told a constituent that the Alberta government is not creating COVID-19 "concentration camps" after that person wrote on her public Facebook page "STOP the COVID concentration camps." Rosin added that "if the rumours are true, those are being set up by the Federal Government and not us." Rosin apologized for how she responded and said that as someone with Jewish ancestry on her grandfather's side, she should have denounced the individual's use of the term "concentration camps."

In December 2020, Rosin mailed Christmas cards to constituents with the official emblem of the Legislature of Alberta. The cards quoted the King James Bible's version of Isaiah 9:6, which reads “For unto us a child is born, unto us a son is given: and the government shall be upon his shoulder: and his name shall be called Wonderful, Counsellor, The mighty God, the everlasting Father, The Prince of Peace.”

Anna Greenwood-Lee, a Calgary priest with the Anglican Church of Canada and a bishop-elect for a diocese in British Columbia, said quoting a bible verse that uses "government" in its translation "sounds a bit like they’re saying they have divine sanction." A UCP spokesperson told the Edmonton Journal that Greenwood-Lee's interpretation “sounds like something spurred on by the tin-foiled hat crowd on Twitter.

In early January 2021, six UCP MLAs were demoted for travelling internationally at a time when the Alberta government was asking people not to travel because of the COVID-19 pandemic. Rosin told Mountain FM she had visited family in Saskatchewan for Christmas, but said no rules were broken because she lived alone. Alberta's restrictions at the time allowed people living alone to visit another household during the holiday season. Rosin was not punished by Kenney.

On January 29, 2021, it was reported by Progress Report that Rosin improperly claimed nearly $800 worth of meal per-diems.

Personal life 
Rosin earned a Bachelor of Business Administration in Marketing and International Business from the University of Regina, and also studied at both the Shanghai Lixin University of Commerce and the Universite de Sherbrooke.

Before her election in 2019, Rosin worked for Coca-Cola's Canadian operations in a managerial role. She is a former vice-president with the Canmore Young Adult Network and has volunteered with Habitat for Humanity and the Regina Food Bank. She plays the oboe, is a seamstress and is an active alpine skier. Her partner is Morgan Nagel, a Cochrane town councillor.

Rosin's ancestry is German Canadian through her great-grandmother and Jewish through her grandfather. Her great-uncle participated in the Normandy landings, but two of her grandmother's uncles spent three years in an internment camp in Kananaskis during the Second World War. Her Jewish ancestors who did not move to Canada are assumed to have died in the Holocaust.

Electoral history

References

United Conservative Party MLAs
Living people
21st-century Canadian politicians
21st-century Canadian women politicians
Women MLAs in Alberta
People from Cochrane, Alberta
1990s births